is a Chisan Shingon temple in Shimanto, Kōchi Prefecture, Japan. Temple 37 on the Shikoku 88 temple pilgrimage, the deities that are worshipped at this temple are Fudō Myō-ō, Shō Kannon, Amida Nyōrai, Yakushi Nyorai, and Jizō Bosatsu. The temple is said to have been founded by Gyōki during 729–749.

History
Gyōki founded Iwamoto-ji in 729 after receiving an imperial command by Emperor Shōmu who had an interest in establishing a system of provincial temples in Japan. He originally built a group of 7 temples to represent the seven stars and seven good fortunes described in Ninnō-gyō. Kōbō-Daishi arrived at Shimanto Town in 810 and added 5 shrines and 5 temples to the area over a span of 14 years.

Several fires caused by war (1573-1592) burned the temples down and were temporarily closed. During 1652–1688, the temple, now known as Iwamoto-ji, was re-built in a different location than its original temple. The 5 honzon that survived from the fire at the other temples were permanently moved to Iwamoto-ji in 1889, and still remain on the temple grounds today.

Buildings
 Hondō
 Sanmon: 
 Shōrō

See also

 Shikoku 88 Temple Pilgrimage
 Shikoku Henro Association Homepage

References

Buddhist temples in Kōchi Prefecture